Ciro Alegria Airport  is an airport serving the town of Santa María de Nieva in the Amazonas Region of Peru.

Airlines and Destinations

See also

Transport in Peru
List of airports in Peru

References

External links
OpenStreetMap - Santa María
OurAirports - Santa María
SkyVector - Santa María

Airports in Peru
Buildings and structures in Amazonas Region